Babb is surname of mostly English origin which has been documented as far back as 1322 in Devon County, England. While the name appears to have originated in the Devon area, Y-DNA Genetic testing has revealed a number of distinct lineages throughout various parts of England.

The surname also appears in the Bavaria state of Germany. Y-DNA Genetic testing has confirmed that this Bavarian line does not relate to the Babbs of England.

Notable people with the surname include 
Alfred Babb (1858-1933), American politician
Charlie Babb (born 1950), American football player
Charlie Babb (baseball) (1873-1954), American baseball player
Chris Babb (born 1990), American basketball player
Faith Babb (fl. 1980–2019), Belizean politician
Gene Babb (born 1934), American football player
Glenn Babb (born 1943), South African politician and diplomat
John H. Babb (1860-1938), American politician
Keedie Babb (born 1982), British singer
Kroger Babb (1906-1980), American film and television producer
Michael Babb (born 1963), British sport shooter
Phil Babb (born 1970), Irish footballer
Pinky Babb, football coach
Sanora Babb (1907–2005), American novelist and poet
Sergio Babb (born 1982), Dutch footballer

Other uses
Babb Creek
Babb, Montana, unincorporated community
Bad Astronomy Bulletin Board, now merged and named BAUT.

See also
Bab (disambiguation)
Babbs (surname)

References